The men's 1500 metres race of the 2015–16 ISU Speed Skating World Cup 5, arranged in the Sørmarka Arena in Stavanger, Norway, was held on 29 January 2016.

Denis Yuskov of Russia won the race, while Bart Swings of Belgium came second, and Kjeld Nuis of the Netherlands came third. Zbigniew Bródka of Poland won the Division B race.

Results
The race took place on Friday, 29 January, with Division B scheduled in the morning session, at 13:22, and Division A scheduled in the afternoon session, at 18:00.

Division A

Division B

References

Men 1500
5